Hobnob Theatre Company is a theater company located in Butler, Pennsylvania. It was established in 2012, and opened with a production of Charles Dickens' A Christmas Carol in December of that year.

In June 2013, Hobnob staged a production of William Shakespeare's The Tempest.  In December, Hobnob again produced A Christmas Carol.  The company, along with the actor playing Scrooge (Jeff Carey), was featured in an interactive article on the New York Times' website.

External links
 Hobnob Theatre Company homepage

References

Theatre companies in Pennsylvania